The Polsby–Popper test is a mathematical compactness measure of a shape developed to quantify the degree of gerrymandering of political districts. The method was developed by lawyers Daniel D. Polsby and Robert Popper, though it had earlier been introduced in the field of paleontology by E.P. Cox. Compared to other measures that use dispersion to measure gerrymandering, the Polsby–Popper test is very sensitive to both physical geography (for instance, convoluted coastal borders) and map resolution. The method was chosen by Arizona's redistricting commission in 2000.

See also
 Isoperimetric inequality

References

Gerrymandering